The Leverhulme Centre for the Future of Intelligence (CFI) is an interdisciplinary research centre within the University of Cambridge that studies artificial intelligence. It is funded by the Leverhulme Trust.

The Centre brings together academics from the fields of computer science, philosophy, social science and others. The centre works with the Oxford Martin School at the University of Oxford, Imperial College London, and the University of California, Berkeley and has a memorandum of understanding with the Coral Bell School of Asia Pacific Affairs at the Australian National University.

Programmes 
The CFI research is structured in a series of programmes and research exercises. The topics of the programmes range from algorithmic transparency to exploring the implications of AI for democracy.

 AI: Futures and Responsibility
 AI: Trust and Society
 Kinds of Intelligence
 AI: Narrative and Justice
 Philosophy and Ethics of AI

In July 2019, Leverhulme released the Animal-AI Olympics competition, featuring tests ordinarily used to test animal intelligence.

See also
 Centre for the Study of Existential Risk
 Future of Humanity Institute
 Future of Life Institute
 Machine Intelligence Research Institute

References

External links
 

Future of Intelligence, Leverhulme Centre for the
Futures studies organizations
Existential risk organizations
Existential risk from artificial general intelligence